Una S. T. Clarke (born December 2, 1934) is an American politician who served in the New York City Council from the 40th district from 1992 to 2001. She is the mother of New York congresswoman Yvette Clarke, who was first elected in 2006 and represents New York's 9th congressional district.

References

1934 births
Living people
New York City Council members
New York (state) Democrats
Women New York City Council members
21st-century American women